Adil Anwar (born 6 July 1987) is a former British professional boxer who competed from 2007 to 2017. He won the English welterweight title in 2011 and challenged for the British super lightweight title in 2013.

Early life and amateur career
Anwar was raised in Burley, Leeds, West Yorkshire, England. His grandfather was a gymnast and boxed in the Army, and several of his uncles were also involved in combat sports.

Anwar started boxing after his father took him to the gym at the age of 13 to learn to defend himself. He was initially reluctant but eased into the sport as he grew older, having his first fight when he was 14 He got into the 'National Boys Clubs' (NACYP) final where he lost to Gary Barker, he then won The Junior ABA Championships and National Boys Clubs at a later date as well as winning whilst boxing for England at International events.

Whilst still an Amateur he was involved in a car accident which left him with a broken collar bone after which he was told it would be unlikely he'd box again, although 18 months after the incident he was back training. Following the incident the England set-up grew distant from Anwar, so he decided to turn professional rather than stay in Amateur Boxing.

In total, he had 65 Amateur fight of which 9 were losses.

Professional career

Weltwerweight

Early career 
Anwar made his professional debut in 2007 but rose to prominence in 2012 after winning the Prizefighter tournament following a victory over undefeated 22-year-old prospect Tyrone Nurse.

Anwar fought at the Welterweight division in 2011. He went on to win the International Masters welterweight title before winning the English welterweight title, a fight he took on at a weeks notice against an undefeated James Flinn.

Light-Welterweight
Following his success with Prizefighter in 2012, Anwar began to call out then British light-welterweight champion Ashley Theophane for a title fight he had been pursuing since the previous year. Shortly after, Theophane lost the title to challenger Darren Hamilton.

Whilst Anwar waited to compete for the British title he won two official British championship eliminators before going on to win the vacant British Masters Gold light-welterweight title. He will finally fight for the British light-welterweight title against Darren Hamilton in July 2013. Anwar lost via unanimous decision to Hamilton at the Echo Arena, judges scored the bout (118-112, 117-112 & 116-113) all in favour of Hamilton.

Light middleweight 
Anwar fell further down the ranks and was looking at getting back into the mix of British super welterweights. Anwar's next scheduled fight was in September 2013 against 35 year old Simone Lucas (4-18-3, 1 KO). Anwar lost a 4-round decision after the referee scored the bout (39-37).

Going back down to welterweight, Anwar went back to winning ways on 28 March 2014 against Lazslo Fazekas (18-12-1, 13 KOs), referee scored it 40-37 in favour of Anwar.

Anwar next fought for the vacant International Masters Silver welterweight title on 9 May 2014 in Sheffield against Chad Gaynor (14-1, 7 KOs). Anwar lost via 2nd-round TKO following a combination of head shots.

Return to Welterweight 
After nearly a year out without having fought, Anwar made another attempt for a comeback in March 2015 against Ryan Hardy (7-4, 0 KOs). After 8 rounds it went to the referees' scorecard who had it at (79-72) in favour of Adil Anwar. This took Anwar's record to 21 wins with 4 losses. Anwar fought again two months later in a losing attempt against Dale Evans (9-2-2, 3 KOs). After 8 rounds the referee scored the fight 77-73. Anwar was down in the 6th and twice in the 8th round.

Anwar took nearly another year out before returning to the ring on 18 March 2016 at Elland Road against Sylwester Walczak (4-20, 0 KOs). The bout stopped after round 1, Walczak quit on his stool claiming he had injured his left shoulder.

Anwar fought on 7 May at the Manchester Arena on the undercard of Crolla vs. Barroso in a 10-round bout for the vacant WBC International Silver welterweight title against Shayne Singleton (22-1, 7 KOs). Anwar was knocked down in round one, although he managed to win the next few rounds more aggressively, he was down again in the 8th round and the referee stopped the fight.

Anwar revealed that he would travel to Spain to challenge Jose Del Rio on 18 March 2017. He lost the fairly close bout via a 10 round unanimous decision with the judges scorecards reading 98-92, 98-95, 96-94 all in favour of Del Rio.

Professional Boxing Record

Personal life 
Anwar belongs to the British Pakistani community. He is a fan of the boxer Naseem Hamed, citing him as an inspiration. Apart from boxing, Anwar is also a rugby fan and a support the Leeds Rhinos rugby league club.

He is currently living in Leeds, West Yorkshire, England. He lives with his wife, Kiran Zubair, two daughters and twin boys.

Championships held
 English welterweight champion.
 International Masters welterweight champion.
 British Masters Gold light-welterweight champion.

References

External links 
 
 Adil Anwar Official Website

1987 births
Living people
English male boxers
English people of Pakistani descent
Martial artists from Leeds
Sportspeople from Yorkshire
British sportspeople of Pakistani descent
Welterweight boxers